Ulleungdo (also spelled Ulreungdo; Hangul:) is a South Korean island 120 km (75 mi) east of the Korean Peninsula in the Sea of Japan, formerly known as the Dagelet Island or Argonaut Island in Europe.
It has a population of 10,426 inhabitants.

The island makes up the main part of Ulleung County, North Gyeongsang Province, South Korea and is a popular tourist destination. The main city of Ulleung-do is the port of Dodong, which serves as the main ferry port between Ulleung-do and the South Korean mainland. After tourism, the main economic activity is fishing, including its well-known harvest of squid, which can be seen drying in the sun in many places.

History 

The island consists primarily of trachyandesite rock.

Archaeological evidence indicates that the island has been inhabited since the 1st millennium BC. The first confirmed historical reference to Ulleung-do is in the Samguk Sagi for the year 512. In that year, the Silla general Kim Isabu conquered the island, which had previously been the autonomous nation of Usan-guk. Some accounts relate that he used a number of wooden lions to intimidate the population, threatening to turn them loose unless they surrendered.

Usan-guk did not remain under the Silla rule, however, and the island did not become a permanent political part of Korea until 930, when it was annexed by Goryeo. Remote as it is from the Korean mainland, Ulleung-do was a recurrent security headache for the Goryeo and Joseon dynasties. It was devastated by Jurchen pirate raids in the 11th century, and by Wokou pirate raids in the 14th century. A clash with Japan over fishing rights in the 1690s was precipitated by the Korean fisherman An Yong-bok. In response to these difficulties, Joseon adopted an "empty-island" policy which however proved impossible to enforce. The empty-island policy was officially rescinded in 1881, after which the government sought to encourage additional settlement of Ulleungdo.

American whaleships cruised for right whales off the island between 1848 and 1892. Some went ashore nearby Jukdo to club pinnipeds.

Geography 

Ulleungdo is a volcanic island that rose from the seabed between the third and fourth Cenozoic periods, and the part of the island is near the peak of the mountain. It is the summit of the longitudinal volcano, which was created by volcanic activity during the 3rd and 4th Cenozoic Era, and consists of trachyte, andesite, and basalt. Hot spot volcanic activity by the General Yi Sa-bu seamount, dissolved Simheungtaek seamount and Liancourt Rocks and Ulleung Island with An Yong-bok seamount was created as well. Liancourt Rocks is 4.6 million years ago estimated 2.5 million years ago, and the creation of Ulleungdo to us, 2.5 million years ago in 5,000 years ago.

There is Seonginbong Peak in the center of the island. In the northern part of the island is the only flat basin, the Nari Basin. The Nari Basin was formed from caldera in the crater of the volcano, which was shaped like a Cheonji or Baekrokdam, but the water was drained and the soil was covered with stones and dirt on the bottom of the lake. There are 650 species of plants, including beech, cedar, and pine trees, and 50 species of birds, including black pigeons, and 340 species of insects.

Tourism 
Favorite activities for tourists are hiking, fishing, and eating hoe (a Korean raw fish dish). Sightseeing boats make regular three-hour circuits about Ulleung-do, departing from the harbor at Dodong and passing by all the points of interest along the coast, including many interesting rock formations and the small neighboring island of Jukdo. Other scenic sites are Seonginbong, the highest peak on the island; Bongnae waterfall; the "natural icehouse"; and a coastal cliff from which the Liancourt Rocks can be discerned in the distance.

Climate

Ulleung-do has a humid subtropical climate (Köppen climate classification Cfa), though it resembles the west coast of Japan much more than Korea, since in winter rainfall is heavy if less so than in such wet cities as Kanazawa or Akita. Sunshine is also very low in the winter if again not so markedly as in the previously-mentioned Japanese cities.

Nature
The island and surrounding water were registered as a marine protected area to secure rich biodiversity in 2014.

As above mentioned, North Pacific right whales and pinnipeds were targeted by whalers and sealers in the adjacent waters. Fin whales were also commonly observed historically, and other cetaceans such as minke whales and dolphins may appear around the island.

Japanese sea lions, now extinct, once bred on the island.

See also
 List of volcanoes in Korea
 Lee Kyu-Won
 People Power Party (South Korea)

References

External links 

 Ulleung County government
Ulleung.go.kr: Tourist Information (in English)
 Ulleungdo, Dokdo islands to be preserved as National Park

Islands of North Gyeongsang Province
Islands of the Sea of Japan
Volcanoes of South Korea
Holocene stratovolcanoes
Inactive volcanoes
VEI-6 volcanoes
Calderas of Asia
Ulleung County